The Candelaria Formation is a geologic formation in Nevada, United States. The formation comprises shales and limestones deposited in an open marine environment and preserves fossils dating back to the Induan (Griesbachian to Dienerian) age of the Early Triassic epoch.

Fossil content 
Among others, the following fossils of ammonoids, bivalves and ray-finned fishes have been recovered from the formation:

 Ambites lilangensis
 Ambites aff. radiatus
 Ardoreosomus occidentalis
 Candelarialepis argentus
 Claraia aurita, C. clarai, C. stachei
 Clypites cf. evolvens
 Grypoceras cf. brahmanicum
 ?Gyrolepis sp.
 Meekoceras cf. tenuistriatum
 Microconchus sp.
 Mullericeras fergusoni, M. spitiense
 Parahedenstroemia kiparisovae
 Proptychites haydeni, P. pagei
 Proptychites cf. ammonoides, P. cf. trilobatus
 Pteronisculus nevadanus
 Radioceras kraffti
 Ussuridiscus sp.
 Vavilovites sp.

See also 

 List of fossiliferous stratigraphic units in Nevada
 Paleontology in Nevada

References

Further reading 
 S. W. Muller and H. G. Ferguson. 1939. Mesozoic stratigraphy of the Hawthorne and Tonopah quadrangles, Nevada. Geological Society America Bulletin 50:1573-1624
 D. Ware, J. F. Jenks, M. Hautmann and H. Bucher. 2011. Dienerian (Early Triassic) ammonoids from the Candelaria Hills (Nevada, USA) and their significance for palaeobiogeography and palaeoceanography. Swiss Journal of Geosciences 104:161-181 https://doi.org/10.1007/s00015-011-0055-3
 C. Romano, A. López-Arbarello, D. Ware, J. F. Jenks, and W. Brinkmann. 2019. Marine Early Triassic Actinopterygii from the Candelaria Hills (Esmeralda County, Nevada, USA). Journal of Paleontology 93:971-1000  https://doi.org/10.1017/jpa.2019.18

Geologic formations of Nevada
Triassic geology of Nevada
Induan Stage
Shale formations of the United States
Limestone formations of the United States
Open marine deposits
Paleontology in Nevada